is Japanese singer-songwriter Ua's fourth single, released on June 21, 1996. It served as ending theme for the TBS TV program M Navi. "Jōnetsu" is regarded as the song that propelled Ua to stardom as well as being her biggest hit. With 5,700 units sold, it debuted at #60 on the Oricon Weekly Singles Chart and later peaked at #18, becoming Ua's first top 20 entry. The song was covered in a Mandarin Chinese version (Retitled "WuWuLaLaLa") by C-pop singer Coco Lee on her 1998 album, Sunny Day. In 2005, urban singer-songwriter Miliyah Katō sampled "Jōnetsu" in her song of the same name. Rock band Glim Spanky released a cover of the song digitally in 2021.

Track listing

CD

Vinyl

Charts, certifications and sales

References

External links
 SPEEDSTAR RECORDS | UA 「情熱」

1996 singles
Ua (singer) songs
1996 songs